Monodosus is a genus of very small and minute sea snails with an operculum, marine gastropod mollusks in the family Vitrinellidae.

Species
 Monodosus brevispiralis Rubio & Rolán, 2016
 Monodosus externus Rubio & Rolán, 2016
 Monodosus multinodosus Rubio & Rolán, 2016
 Monodosus paucistriatus Rubio & Rolán, 2016
 Monodosus planus Rubio & Rolán, 2016
 Monodosus prolatus Rubio & Rolán, 2016
 Monodosus proximus Rubio & Rolán, 2016
 Monodosus simulans Rubio & Rolán, 2016

References

 Rubio F. & Rolán E. (2016). A new genus of the family Tornidae (Gastropoda, Trunctalloidea) with the description of eight new species. Iberus. 34(2): 109-126.

External links
 

Vitrinellidae